The Midland Railway 1377 Class was a class of 185 0-6-0T tank locomotives.  They were introduced in 1878 by Samuel W. Johnson, and were almost identical to the 1102 class of 1874; the latter having fully enclosed cabs, while the 1377 class were built without a rear to the cab and only a short cab roof, hence their nickname "half-cabs". They were given the power classification 1F.

Construction history
Up to 1891, 185 were built: 165 by Derby Works and the last 20 by the Vulcan Foundry. Originally they were built with type A boilers with round-topped fireboxes, but many later received type G5 boilers with Belpaire fireboxes.

Service history

All 185 passed to the London, Midland and Scottish Railway (LMS) at the grouping in 1923. Withdrawals started in 1927 and by 1948 when the railways were nationalised, 72 locomotives passed into British Railways ownership in 1948 and they allocated numbers 40000 higher than their LMS numbers, although 14 were withdrawn before the new numbers were applied. Withdrawals continued and by 1961 only 11 remained; the last five were withdrawn in September 1965. The class had only lasted as long as it had because the Midland Railway had signed a contract in 1866 to provide shunting engines to Staveley Ironworks for 100 years; the 1Fs, as they were by then, were the only locomotives suitable to perform this duty.

Beyond their work with the Midland Railway, LMS and British Railways, six members of this class - 1666, 1708, 1751, 1788, 1839 and 1890 - were requisitioned by the War Department during World War II between 1940 and 1944, to operate the Melbourne Military Railway (MMR) in South Derbyshire. No. 1839 was replaced by No. 1773 during its time on the MMR.

Conversion
In 1932, the frames of 1831 were used for LMS diesel shunter 1831.

Preservation

One of the Staveley engines, 1418 (renumbered 1708 by the Midland Railway in 1907, and 41708 by British Railways), has survived to preservation at Barrow Hill Engine Shed. Before Barrow Hill this engine was preserved on the Midland Railway - Butterley, the Keighley and Worth Valley Railway, and the Swanage Railway respectively. The surviving engine became the inspiration of the Bachmann Branchline OO scale model of the class introduced in 2014. The model, the dispute and the class had an extensive write up in Model Rail during 2014. No. 41708 has been bought by Barrow Hill who took the first steps to return the locomotive to working order in November, 2020.

References

1377
0-6-0T locomotives
Railway locomotives introduced in 1878
Standard gauge steam locomotives of Great Britain
Vulcan Foundry locomotives